The Back River Farm, also known as the Samuel Emerson Farm, is a historic farmstead on Bay View Road in Dover, New Hampshire.  The land along the Bellamy River (also known as the Back River) has been farmed since Samuel Emerson acquired  in the area in 1696, and is the only surviving period farmstead in the area.  The farm, including a mid-18th century farmhouse, was listed on the National Register of Historic Places in 1984.

Description and history
Most of this land is relatively flat, and in pasture. The farmstead stands on the south side of Bay View Road, screened from the road by trees, but with open views to the south. The house is a two-story timber frame construction, five bays wide, with a central chimney and a rear leanto section, giving the house a saltbox appearance. The house has interior woodworking features that embody both First Period work and early Georgian styling. This woodwork was probably done by the second Samuel Emerson, who described his profession as that of joiner.

In 1696 the first Samuel Emerson acquired  of land, and began farming. The area was in the 18th century mainly composed of this type of salt water farm, of which this is now the last surviving example. Emerson was brother to Hannah Duston, who became well known for her captivity narrative after being held captive by (and escaping from) Native Americans in 1697. It was sold out of the family in 1876.

See also
National Register of Historic Places listings in Strafford County, New Hampshire

References

Farms on the National Register of Historic Places in New Hampshire
Commercial buildings completed in 1750
Buildings and structures in Dover, New Hampshire
Houses in Strafford County, New Hampshire
National Register of Historic Places in Strafford County, New Hampshire